Sylvana Indira Nikita IJsselmuiden (born November 24, 1994, Leeuwarden) is a Dutch model, television presenter and actress. After starting her career with SBS6 she hosts shows for both TV and online.

Biography and career 
IJsselmuiden was born in Leeuwarden and grows up in a family with two brothers and a sister. After finishing HAVO she studies Artiest Drama at D'Drive in Leeuwarden and starts her career hosting SBS6's Babes in Business and Uit Voorraad Leverbaar.

After SBS6 she presents for Xite, Omrop Fryslân and RTL 4. She also becomes reporter for Dumpert and co-stars in the Dumpertreeten online series. She hosts the Autobahn F1 Show for the Autobahn online magazine. Apart from her jobs as a presenter IJsselmuiden also works as a model.

In 2015 IJsselmuiden makes her debut as an actress. She plays Mieke in the 2015 Fout Bloed mini series. In 2016 she plays the role of Fleur in the film Fissa and plays a barmaid in the film Fataal. She also appears in the films De Masters and Hartenstrijd.

In 2020 IJselmuiden placed first in the FHM500 making her the most beautiful woman of the Netherlands of 2020.

Notes

External links 
 Officiële website
 

People from Leeuwarden
1994 births
Living people
Dutch female models
Dutch television presenters
21st-century Dutch actresses
Dutch film actresses
Dutch television actresses
Dutch women television presenters